Amance is the name of several places in France:

 Amance (river), a river in the Haute-Marne and Haute-Saône département
 Amance, Aube, a commune in the Aube département
 Amance, Meurthe-et-Moselle, in a commune the Meurthe-et-Moselle département
 Amance, Haute-Saône, in a commune the Haute-Saône département